Alexander Stewart (died 1593) was a Scottish courtier and diplomat.

He was a younger son of Alexander Stewart of Scotstounhill, a captain of Blackness Castle, and Elizabeth Hamilton.

Blackness Castle

The older Alexander Stewart's record as captain of Blackness for the Scottish crown was a subject of comment by Richard Bannatyne. In March 1572, during the Marian Civil War, he surrendered the castle to the supporters of Mary, Queen of Scots, for 300 crowns, after his expenses had not been met by the King's side. In January 1573, he was made captain again, and pledged his eldest son as hostage for his good service. 

Unfortunately, while he was making these arrangements in Edinburgh, one of his prisoners, James Kirkcaldy bribed the guards and took Blackness. Kirkcaldy then managed to capture Alexander Stewart and his brother John and locked them up in their own castle. Alexander Stewart set about bribing the same soldiers and Regent Morton forced James Kirkcaldy's wife Helen Leslie to make him surrender. When Helen Leslie came to Blackness, James Kirkcaldy came to the iron yett to welcome her and his soldiers shut him out and pelted him with stones from the tower. 

Other sources suggest that James Kirkcaldy, brother of the Marian leader William Kirkcaldy of Grange, surrendered Blackness to Regent Morton after a conventional siege.

Mission to England
In 1586 Alexander Stewart, the son, was involved in negotiations after Mary, Queen of Scots, had been sentenced to death in England. Stewart was in London with the Master of Gray and Robert Melville in January 1587. His actions displeased his colleagues, who felt he was undermining their work to save the queen's life. Melville wrote that Stewart had exceeded his credit as a diplomat and was insisting that he alone knew the king's mind. It remains unclear if Stewart was acting with special instructions from James VI. He was sent to Scotland without the consent of the other diplomats and brought letters from the Earl of Leicester to James VI which discredited the Master of Gray.

George Young, another negotiator in London, was disappointed by Stewart's conduct as a diplomat, and wrote to William Cecil that he was, "sory in gude faith that he or any Scottisman sould overshute himself sa farre in a mater quhilk I doubt not his majestie will let appeare mair clearlie".

Bridge Castle
In March 1587, his parents and older brother James Stewart sold the lands and castle of Little Ogilface in Brighouse near Torphichen to William Livingstone, 6th Lord Livingston. The castle, probably built by James Stewart and his wife Helen Sinclair, is now known as "Bridge Castle".

Feud
Alexander Stewart became involved in a feud between a wealthy lawyer, John Graham of Hallyards, and the Sandilands family which followed a dubious property transaction. On 13 February 1593 James Sandilands of Slamannan, the Duke of Lennox, and Alexander Stewart were going to play golf. They encountered John Graham and his followers on Leith Wynd. The Grahams opened fire and Stewart and was killed. John Graham was shot and carried to a nearby house where Stewart's French page stabbed him to death.

References

1593 deaths
Court of James VI and I